Bamboo chicken is a chicken curry prepared by stuffing chicken in bamboo segments and then cooking it on charcoal. Bamboo chicken is an oil free and nutritionally rich dish.

Origins

Bamboo chicken is a traditional tribal cuisine of Araku Valley, a hill station in the Visakhapatnam district in the state of Andhra Pradesh.

Preparation

Ingredients
Skinless chicken(cut the chicken into small pieces),chopped onions, chopped green chillies, ginger paste, garlic paste, dry spices: salt, turmeric powder, red chilli powder, garam masala powder, chicken masala powder.

Method
 Marinate the chicken with all the ingredients and keep this aside for 1 hour.
 Stuff the marinated chicken into the bamboo shoot through the open side and close the open end with leaves (banana leaves or palm leaves).
 Roast the bamboo stick for at least 45 minutes on a medium flame, by keeping it on coal.
 After 45 minutes, cut open the bamboo shoot. 
 Take out the chicken pieces.
 Garnish with a few drops of lemon juice and chopped onions.

Serving
It is mainly eaten with rice, roti, naan or any other bread.

See also

 List of chicken dishes

References

Indian chicken dishes